Norbert Krzysztof Kościuch (born 28 April 1984) is a speedway rider from Poland.

Speedway career
He rode in the top tier of British Speedway riding for the Peterborough Panthers during the 2013 Elite League speedway season. He began his career in Poland with Unia Leszno.

References 

1984 births
Living people
Polish speedway riders
Peterborough Panthers riders